Kaboré Bebzinda, better known as Philippe Zinda Kaboré (18 November 1920, Koudougou, French Upper Volta - 25 May 1947, Abidjan, French Ivory Coast) was a politician of Voltaic origin.

Biography

Zinda Kaboré, the son of a chief of the traditional village Mossi, was a student at Bingerville, Ivory Coast and Dakar, Senegal. On 10 November 1946, he was elected, along with Félix Houphouët-Boigny and Ouezzin Coulibaly, as one of the three deputies of the colony of Ivory Coast in the French National Assembly. He died a few months later, on 25 May 1947, in Abidjan, Ivory Coast at the age of 26. Rumor maintained that he was poisoned, but doctors determined that he had a heart attack.

Honors

One of the main high schools in Burkina Faso bears his name.

References 
 1st page on the French National Assembly website
 2nd page on the French National Assembly website

Resources

Translated from the article in French Wikipedia.

Official Burkina webpage's biography (in French)

1920 births
1947 deaths
People from Centre-Ouest Region
People of French West Africa
Burkinabé politicians
Union progressiste politicians
Deputies of the 1st National Assembly of the French Fourth Republic
Burkinabé expatriates in Senegal
Burkinabé expatriates in Ivory Coast